Cai Qirui (7 January 1914 – 3 October 2016) was a Chinese chemist, educator and academician of the Chinese Academy of Sciences (CAS). He was known as the founder of Chinese catalytic chemistry.

Biography
Cai graduated from Xiamen University in 1937, majoring in chemistry. He became a teaching assistant at Xiamen University. He moved to Ohio State University by government study abroad scholarship in 1947 and earned his doctoral degree in 1950. He was forbidden to leave the United States after the Korean War broke. The travel ban on Cai was lifted in 1955 as the result of a swap for 11 U.S. airmen held captive by China since the end of the Korean War. He returned to Xiamen University in April 1956. He studied catalytic chemistry instead of structural chemistry for Chinese national needs. Cai played an important role in coordination complex catalysis theory, nitrogen fixation into ammonia and C-1 chemistry which made him the founder of Chinese catalytic chemistry. He won China's State Natural Science Award three times and was elected an academician of the Chinese Academy of Sciences in 1980.

Cai died on 3 October 2016 at the age of 102 in Xiamen.

References

1914 births
2016 deaths
Chemists from Fujian
Chinese centenarians
Educators from Fujian
Hokkien scientists
Members of the Chinese Academy of Sciences
Men centenarians
Ohio State University Graduate School alumni
People from Xiamen
Prisoner exchanges
Xiamen University alumni
Academic staff of Xiamen University